Miss Colombia 1999, the  64th Miss Colombia pageant, was held in Cartagena de Indias, Colombia, on November 12, 1999, after three weeks of events.  The winner of the pageant was Catalina Acosta, Señorita Cundinamarca.

The pageant was broadcast live on RCN TV from the Centro de Convenciones Julio Cesar Turbay in Cartagena de Indias, Colombia. At the conclusion of the final night of competition, outgoing titleholder Marianella Maal Paccini crowned Catalina Acosta of Cundinamarca as the new Miss Colombia.

Placements

Placements

Special awards

Delegates 
The Miss Colombia 1999 delegates are:

Antioquia - Alejandra Vélez Londoño
Atlántico - Liliana María Salazar Lara
Barranquilla - Caroll Marcela Nobman Rocha
Bogotá D.C. - Catalina Molano Vega
Bolívar -  Talia Maia Vejarano Bravo
Boyacá - Katherin Carolina Nieto Abaunza
Caldas - Raquel Cecilia Jaramillo Castrillo
Cartagena DT y C - Karen Cecilia Martínez Insignares
Cauca -  María Paola Vejarano Restrepo
Chocó - Isneida Ortiz Salazar
Cundinamarca - Catalina Inés Acosta Albarracín
Guainía -  Yeris Paola Sepúlveda García
Guajira - Paola Andrea Illidge Uribe
Magdalena - Carolina Hoyos Soto
Meta - Ana María Rujeles Flórez
Nariño - Rosa Janeth Coral Restrepo
Norte de Santander - Sandra Elizabeth Pérez Pernía
Santander - Claudia Lucía Rey Cote
Sucre -  Olga Milena Flórez Sierra
Tolima - Yovana Milena Flórez Flórez
Valle - Carolina Cruz Osorio

External links
 Official site

Miss Colombia
1999 in Colombia
1999 beauty pageants